Martin David Uden (born 28 February 1955) is, as of December 2012, the co-ordinator of the Panel of Experts at the United Nations which deals with North Korea regarding the sanctions against that country established by United Nations Security Council Resolution 1874. He was previously Managing Director of the British Business Embassy at UKTI, which he joined in March 2012. Before that he served as a British Diplomat, most recently as the British Ambassador to South Korea.

Previous diplomatic postings in Korea were as the British embassy's Second Secretary (1978–1981), and as Political Counsellor (1994–1997).

Uden carried one of the Olympic torches as part of the 2012 Olympic torch relay, expressing a desire that it "would be symbolic of the many connections between the UK and Korea, two great sporting nations".

Publications

Offices held

References 

Living people
1955 births
Ambassadors of the United Kingdom to South Korea